Anna Märtha Vilhelmina Adlerstråhle (16 June 1868 – 4 January 1956) was a Swedish tennis player. Aged 40 she won a bronze medal in the indoor singles competition at the 1908 Summer Olympics. She was the first woman to represent Sweden at the Olympics.

References

Further reading 
 

1868 births
1956 deaths
People from Kungsör Municipality
Swedish female tennis players
Olympic tennis players of Sweden
Tennis players at the 1908 Summer Olympics
Olympic bronze medalists for Sweden
Olympic medalists in tennis
Medalists at the 1908 Summer Olympics
20th-century Swedish women
Sportspeople from Västmanland County